Karrinyup Road is a major east-west arterial road in the inner northern suburbs of Perth, Western Australia, connecting the City of Stirling council offices, Osborne Park Hospital and Karrinyup Shopping Centre with residential estates in Innaloo, Stirling and Balcatta.

Route description
Karrinyup Road is part of State Route 76 for most of its length, east of West Coast Highway, and part of Tourist Drive 204 for the remaining section in Trigg. The speed limit is mostly , though it is  within the vicinity of the Karrinyup Shopping Centre and within Trigg. Main Roads Western Australia controls and maintains Karrinyup Road, and is part of Main Roads' internal designation H28 Karrinyup–Morley Highway, along with Morley Drive.

Karrinyup Road commences in Trigg at a roundabout with West Coast Drive, assuming Tourist Drive 204 which continues along West Coast Drive northwards. After  the road reaches a traffic light intersection at Marmion Avenue (north) and West Coast Highway (south), at which point Tourist Drive 204 turns southbound on West Coast Highway, and Karrinyup Road gains the State Route 76 allocation.  later Karrinyup Road intersects with Jeanes Road as well as the entrance to the Karrinyup Shopping Centre. The road then travels along the vicinity of the shopping centre and Karrinyup bus station before reaching Francis Avenue  later. Karrinyup Road reaches Huntriss Road  later, and then, within the suburb of Gwelup, North Beach Road  later.

Following the Mitchell Freeway interchange, Karrinyup Road is within the suburb of Stirling. After providing access to the Osborne Park Hospital the road reaches Cedric Street  later.  the road reaches Jones Street, and then another  takes the road to Grindleford Drive and San Remo Boulevard. Karrinyup Road reaches Main Street in Balcatta , at which point it continues east as Morley Drive.

History
The road, especially the portion between the Mitchell Freeway and Main Street, was one of the first roads in the area, known as Balcatta Beach Road and later as North Beach Road. Until the 1990s, most of this stretch of the road was still fledged by functioning market gardens.

For part of 1984, Karrinyup Road represented the northern terminus of the Mitchell Freeway. Prior to the freeway's construction, this location was the intersection of Odin Road between Innaloo and the Balcatta industrial area.

From 2019 to 2021, to coincide with the extensive renovation of the Karrinyup Shopping Centre, roadworks occurred on Karrinyup Road between the Mitchell Freeway and Marmion Avenue, including the addition of bus lanes within the vicinity of the shopping centre, relocation of Karrinyup bus station, and intersection upgrades of Jeanes Road, Francis Avenue, and Huntriss Road.

Major intersections

  West Coast Drive (Tourist Drive 204), Trigg
  Marmion Avenue (State Route 71) north / West Coast Highway (State Route 71 / Tourist Drive 204) south, Trigg and Karrinyup
 Francis Avenue, Karrinyup (at Karrinyup Shopping Centre)
 Huntriss Road, Karrinyup, Gwelup and Innaloo
 North Beach Road, Gwelup and Innaloo
  Mitchell Freeway (State Route 2), Gwelup, Innaloo and Stirling
  Cedric Street (State Route 64), Stirling
  Morley Drive (State Route 76) east / Main Street north and south,

See also

References

Roads in Perth, Western Australia
City of Stirling
Karrinyup, Western Australia